The hired armed brig Colpoys was a French vessel launched in 1803 that a Briton acquired that year. He chartered her to the Royal Navy from 28 April 1804 until 22 August 1807. She was originally a schooner that apparently was converted to a brig in early 1805. She participated in the blockade of Brest and captured numerous small vessels. After Colpoyss contract ended she is listed until 1811, but there are no other traces of her.

The vessel
Colpoys was one of four vessels that Mr. T. Lockyer, of Plymouth, owned that the government hired at the same time. In reporting the transaction, the Naval Chronicle described Colpoys as a schooner under the command of Lieutenant Usher (or Ussher), and the two chase guns as 6-pounders. Throughout Colpoyss military career, references to her in the London Gazette and Lloyd's List fluctuated between describing her as a brig, cutter, and schooner. There are no references in Admiralty records of other vessels by that name, and the names of her commander generally assure that all these vessels are one and the same.

In a letter dated 11 February 1805, Ussher refers to his vessel as "Colpoys, hired schooner". Then in a letter dated September 1805, Ussher refers to his vessel as "Colpoys hired brig". That would suggest that she was converted from schooner-rig to brig-rig between those dates. In a letter  dated Torbay, 19 March 1805, Vice-Admiral Sir Charles Cotton reported that he had taken command of a number of vessels there that Admiral William Cornwallis had left behind. One of these was the "brig Colpoys". That would suggest that the conversion from schooner to brig had occurred in February–March 1805.

In his biography of Thomas Ussher, Marshall describes Colpoys as having a crew of 40 men.

First commander: Thomas Ussher

1804
Lieutenant Thomas Ussher (or Usher) was appointed to command Colpoys on 6 April 1804. She then was attached to Admiral Cornwallis's blockading force off Brest. On 7 May she was at Plymouth when sealed dispatches arrived and she immediately set out to westward, destination unknown but presumed to be for the Streights . On 30 June, a Spanish brig, the Nombra del Jesus, and her cargo of soap, brandy, and the like, arrived at Plymouth. She had been sailing to Morlaix when Colpoys captured her and sent her in.

Towards the end of 1804 Ussher was assigned to be the second-in-command to Captain Peter Puget in a proposed operation to destroy the fleet at Brest by means of fire ships. However a succession of winter gales blew the British fleet from the coast. When the fleet regained its station Cornwallis was unsure as to whether or not the enemy had left port. Ussher, of his own accord, that night sailed close to shore and then took his gig (a 4-oared boat) into the harbour. He rowed along the whole French line, which consisted of 21 ships. The French spotted the gig as it was alongside the flagship, but though several enemy boats pursued him, Ussher escaped. The next day Colpoys joined the British squadron flying the signal "The enemy the same as when last reconnoitered".
 
Ussher's next exploit was to land at midnight on 6 September with only six men not more than 200 yards from Fort de Bertheaume. There he captured a signal-post with its copy of the French private signals. Lloyd's Patriotic Fund gave Mr. Francis Rennells, Colpoyss mate, an honour sword worth £30 for "his spirited conduct" in the attack.

1805
On 8 January 1805 the "armed ship" Colpoys brought a Spanish prize into Portsmouth. Then on 17 February there arrived at Plymouth Jong Jerrens (or Jong Jarrett) Bart, master, which had been sailing from Marens or (or Marennes) to Bilbao when Colpoys detained her.

Next, on 5 February, Colpoys was off Cape Machicacho, some 60 kilometres west of San Sebastián when Ussher sighted a chasse-marée going along the shore. Ussher set out in his boat and drove her ashore beneath the guns of a shore battery. He landed, spiked four of the guns, and threw a fifth over the parapet of the battery. The chasse-marée had bilged; she had been carrying brandy. In his letter to Cornwallis, Ussher also reported that Colpoys had detained three neutral vessels on their way to Spain. These were:

Swedish vessel Catherina Christina, detained on 28 January as she was carrying earthenware from Hull to Santander:
Prussian galiot Catherina Dorothea, detained on 3 February while carrying wheat from Marens to Santander; and,
Prussian galiot Jonge Guiet Bart, detained on 6 February while also carrying wheat from Marens to Santander.

On 17 February there arrived at Plymouth Jong Jerrens (or Jong Jarrett Bart, which Lloyd's List reported had been sailing from Marens or (or Marennes) to Bilbao when Colpoys detained her.

Fortuitously, the next day Cornwallis wrote to Mr. William Marsden, Secretary to the Admiralty, explaining that although there had been long-standing orders that neutral vessels trading with Spain were not to be detained, that after hostilities with Spain were announced, British captains had "generally understood that those orders were not in force", and giving Ussher's letter as an example. Cornwallis explained that he had just received a letter from the Lords Commissioners of the Admiralty, dated 4 February, stating that the orders were still in force, and that he would so advise the flag officers, captains, and commanders under his orders.

In March 1805 Colpoys was at Torbay and by 3 April she was at Ushant where Admiral Gardner took command of a fleet consisting of 17 ships of the line, plus one brig, Colpoys. She then carried dispatches between Ushant and Ferrol and back, returning to Ushant on 27 May. In July she again carried dispatches to Ferrol.

On 15 August, "His Majesty's Hired Armed Brig Colpoys" captured the American ship Olive Branch. She had been sailing from Nantes to St. Lucar, and Admiral Colpoys sent her into Plymouth.

About three weeks later, Colpoys captured two sloops, Federation, and another of unknown name. In a letter to Cornwallis, Ussher reported that he had captured Anna Maria on 5 September four miles west of Arcarchon. The next day he captured Fédération some ten leagues NE of San Sebastián. He reported that there had been a third vessel, a Spanish brig, that had sailed with them but which he had not encountered. They were carrying 5000 sweeps and 400 grinding stones from San Sebastián to Brest for the account of the French government; the cargoes were intended for the French fleet at Boulogne.

Towards the end of the year, on 28 December, "His Majesty's Hired Armed Cutter Colpoys" recaptured the Swedish ship Anna Maria Dorothea.

1806
In early January 1806, Colpoys detained Hercules, Weeks, master, which had been sailing from New York, and sent her into  Plymouth.

On 18 February 1806 Colpoys recaptured Anna Margaretha Dorothea. Three days later Colpoys captured Prussian ship Mercurius. Mercurius, Hendiess, master, arrived at Plymouth on 22 February, together with Freija, Jordt, master, which had been sailing from Amsterdam to Leghorn when Colpoys detained her.

Five days after that, Colpoys captured the Prussian ship Evadne. This may have been Erandt, Gast, master, which had been sailing from Bordeaux to Embden and which arrived in Plymouth in early March. In mid-March Dragon, Beacon, master, which had been sailing from Lisbon to Corunna, arrived at Plymouth, a prize to Colpoys.

A week or so later, on 21 March, Colpoys captured three Spanish luggers under a battery of six 24-pounders in the port of Avilés. Two of the captured vessels, Santa Buena Ventura and San Antonio were both armed with two guns and carried cargoes of flax and steel. The third vessel was San Real, which was in ballast. Ussher, with six men, was in the lead British boat. When he and his men arrived at the first of the three Spanish vessels their crews and some soldiers stationed on board them jumped off. Still, the British took 13 men prisoners. Apparently, he sent two men to the commander of the battery protecting the port to inform him that if the Spanish fired on British as they withdrew Ussher would hang his prisoners. Colpoys had two men wounded in the attack, one of them seriously. Ussher left his eleven remaining prisoners on San Real, which he left behind. The two luggers arrived at Penzance on 31 March, and San Antonio arrived at Plymouth in mid-April. Bon Aventura arrived there on 17 April. The Lloyd's Patriotic Fund awarded Ussher an honour sword valued at £50 for his feat.<ref>Lloyd's Patriotic Fund, - accessed 22 February 2014.</ref>

An item appeared in the Naval Chronicle to the effect that during the February–March period, Colpoys had engaged a ship stronger than herself off Ferrol, almost under the batteries. Colpoys forced the enemy to run ashore, where the vessel bilged and sank; the crew were saved. Unfortunately, there does not seem to be any other, confirming source for this report.

On 19 April, 24 men from Colpoys and the gun-brig , under Ussher's command, landed at the entrance of the river Donillan and spiked two guns of a battery in order to be able to proceed up the river in pursuit of two chasse-marées. They then caught up with their quarries, capturing Vincent Gabriel and Marie Française, which they were able to bring out. They also destroyed the signal station at Donillan. The British suffered no casualties in the operation.

Early in May Colpoys sent in a French lugger with a cargo of slates.

Then on 30 June, Colpoys and the hired armed cutter Frisk captured the French chasse-marées No. 1 and No. 2. On 14 July the two British vessels captured the Spanish chasse-marée No.3.

Soon afterwards, with the gun-brig  and Frisk under his orders, Ussher volunteered to cut out a French frigate lying at San Sebastián. However, contrary winds delayed him and the frigate sailed.

With the same vessels, and the schooner Felix, he destroyed several batteries at St. Antonio, Avilés, and Bermeo, and on 28 July he captured the town of Ea. However less than a week later he was obliged to resign command of Colpoys as his leg wound had broken out afresh.

In mid-July Colpoys sent into Britain the Portuguese vessel Aurora, Morchado, master, which had been sailing from Nantes to Lisbon.

On Ussher's departure from Colpoys, her crew presented him with a sabre as token of their "respect and esteem." On 18 October now Commander Ussher received command of the brig-sloop .

Second commander: David Buchan
Lieutenant David Buchan replaced Ussher. By 19 September he was already in command of Colpoys and at sea, recapturing . The French frigates Sirène and Revanche had captured the Eddystone, Sarman, master, on 13 September as she was sailing from Quebec to London. The Frenchmen took out her captain, crew, and furs, which were the most valuable part of her cargo. Colpoys recaptured Eddystone off Cape Finisterre and sent her into Plymouth, where she arrived in early October.

1807
In the new year, in the first week of January 1807,  and Colpoys sent into Plymouth Cupedo, which had been sailing from Montevideo to St Sebastian.

Then on 12 February 1807, Colpoys captured the French brig Prudente. This may have been Providence, a French brig carrying pitch and tar, that arrived in Plymouth in mid-March, a prize to Colpoys.

On 27 July they sighted 16 enemy vessels in the entrance sailing eastward. Because it was nearly calm the British ships had no chance of closing with the French vessels so Capt. Dilkes of Hazard sent the boats in chase. The British came under intense small-arms fire from the shore that caused no casualties. The boats were able to capture nine chasse-marées, two of them armed.

The captured vessels were: Deux Amis (armed with two 4-pounder guns), Trois Frere Horaces (armed with four swivel guns, Veronique (laden with wheat), Sans Pareil (laden with wheat), Marie Francoise (in ballast), Mairie Louise (in ballast), Bon Janton (in ballast), Pascal (in ballast), and Gaulle (in ballast). Their crews escaped on shore with all their papers. The crew of a tenth chasse-maree scuttled their vessel to prevent the British from capturing her. The British drove six on to the shore, one of which was armed with six guns. The schooner  shared in the prize money for the action. The lugger Trois Amis and the chasse maree Courier de Nantes, each of about 20 tons (bm), and their cargoes, were auctioned on 20 April 1807 at Plymouth.

In addition, between 1 April and 10 June the small squadron captured and destroyed two sloops, Rosalie and Jeune Marie, and five chasse-marées: Petit Marie, Patriot, Marianne, Belle Louise Josephine, and Marie Françoise. Colpoys escorted the prizes back to Plymouth. Lastly, French shore batteries sank one chasse-marée, of unknown name, after the British had captured her.

Post-naval careerColpoys first appeared in the Register of Shipping in 1806. The entry gave her master as W. Neale, her owner as T. Lockyer, and her occupation as government service based out of Plymouth. The entry also described her as a schooner. This entry continues unchanged through 1811. She was no longer listed in 1812, and never appeared in Lloyd's Register''.

Notes, citations, and references
Notes

Citations

References

 
 
 

 

1803 ships
Schooners of the Royal Navy
Brigs of the Royal Navy
Hired armed vessels of the Royal Navy